The 2009 Islamabad Frontier Corps post bombing was a suicide attack that took place on the Pakistan paramilitary Frontier Corps (FC) post at Jinnah Super Market in Sector E/7 of the Margalla area of Islamabad on Saturday, 4 April 2009. Five people were killed and five were injured. Policemen were taking dinner at the time.

Reaction
"The suicide bomber came from behind the bushes when the FC personnel broke for dinner and got a chance to detonate the device" said Interior Advisor Rehman.

See also
Violence in Pakistan 2006-09, table and map providing overview of all violence in Pakistan between 2006 and 2009.
War in Northwest Pakistan

References

2009 murders in Pakistan
21st-century mass murder in Pakistan
Terrorist incidents in Pakistan in 2009
Mass murder in 2009
Suicide bombings in Pakistan
Terrorist incidents in Islamabad